Richard David Keith Jefferies, DSO (2 December 1920 – 9 October 2013) was a decorated junior officer in the Australian Army during the Second World War, and a businessman in the post-war years. He was awarded the Distinguished Service Order as a lieutenant following his involvement in the Battle of Buin Road on 19 March 1945.

After his discharge from the army, Jefferies worked in the movie theatre business in Sydney, was at one point managing director of AMF Bowling Australia, and, from 1972, owned and operated a number of bowling and roller skating businesses across Queensland and New South Wales.

References

1920 births
2013 deaths
20th-century Australian businesspeople
Australian Army officers
Australian Companions of the Distinguished Service Order
Australian Army personnel of World War II
Businesspeople from Queensland
People from Armidale
People from Toowoomba